The Northgate is in Chester, Cheshire, England, where it carries the city walls footpath over Northgate Street.  It is recorded in the National Heritage List for England as a designated Grade I listed building.

History

The present Northgate stands on the site of the original northern Roman entrance to Chester.  During the medieval period, it was unimportant and it was used only for local access.  At that time it consisted of a simple rectangular tower with a narrow gateway.  It later was the site of the local gaol.  The present Northgate was built in 1810 to replace a medieval gatehouse and was designed by Thomas Harrison for Chester City Council.

Architecture

It is built in pale red sandstone ashlar and consists of a segmental arch with a coffered soffit which spans the carriageway.  On each side of the arch is a rectangular portal for the pavement.  On both sides of the portals are attached unfluted monolithic Doric half-columns at each corner. Across the top of the structure is a dentilled cornice which carries a panelled parapet.  In constructing Northgate, Harrison used "as few and as huge stones as possible".

See also

Grade I listed buildings in Cheshire West and Chester
List of works by Thomas Harrison
Bridgegate, Chester
Eastgate, Chester

References
Citations

Sources

External links 
 .
 The Northgate on 'Chester: a Virtual Stroll Around the Walls'

Arch bridges in the United Kingdom
Grade I listed bridges
Bridges in Cheshire
Grade I listed buildings in Chester
Bridges completed in 1810
Northgate
Neoclassical architecture in England
Grade I listed gates
Town Gates in England
Stone bridges in England
Thomas Harrison buildings